The contemporary national legal systems are generally based on one of four basic systems: civil law, common law, statutory law, religious law or combinations of these. However, the legal system of each country is shaped by its unique history and so incorporates individual variations. The science that studies law at the level of legal systems is called comparative law.

Both civil (also known as Roman) and common law systems can be considered the most widespread in the world: civil law because it is the most widespread by landmass and by population overall, and common law because it is employed by the greatest number of people compared to any single civil law system.

Civil law

The source of law that is recognized as authoritative is codifications in a constitution or statute passed by legislature, to amend a code.
While the concept of codification dates back to the Code of Hammurabi in Babylon ca. 1790 BC, civil law systems derive from the Roman Empire and, more particularly, the Corpus Juris Civilis issued by the Emperor Justinian ca. AD 529. This was an extensive reform of the law in the Byzantine Empire, bringing it together into codified documents. Civil law was also partly influenced by religious laws such as Canon law and Islamic law. Civil law today, in theory, is interpreted rather than developed or made by judges. Only legislative enactments (rather than legal precedents, as in common law) are considered legally binding.

Scholars of comparative law and economists promoting the legal origins theory usually subdivide civil law into distinct groups:
 French civil law: in France, the Benelux countries, Italy, Romania, Spain and former colonies of those countries;
 German civil law: in Germany, Austria, Russia, Switzerland, Estonia, Latvia, Bosnia and Herzegovina, Croatia, Kosovo*, North Macedonia, Montenegro, Slovenia, Serbia, Greece, Portugal and its former colonies, Turkey, and East Asian countries including Japan, South Korea, and Taiwan (Republic of China);
 Scandinavian civil law: in Denmark, Norway, and Sweden. As historically integrated into the Scandinavian cultural sphere, Finland and Iceland also inherited the system.

However, some of these legal systems are often and more correctly said to be of hybrid nature:
Napoleonic to Germanistic influence (Italian civil law) 
The Italian civil code of 1942 replaced the original one of 1865, introducing germanistic elements due to the geopolitical alliances of the time. The Italian approach has been imitated by other countries including Portugal (1966), the Netherlands (1992), Lithuania (2000), Brazil (2002) and Argentina (2014). Most of them have innovations introduced by the Italian legislation, including the unification of the civil and commercial codes.

Germanistic to Napoleonic influence (Swiss civil law)
The Swiss civil code is considered mainly influenced by the German civil code and partly influenced by the French civil code.  The civil code of the Republic of Turkey is a slightly modified version of the Swiss code, adopted in 1926 during Mustafa Kemal Atatürk's presidency as part of the government's progressive reforms and secularization.

A comprehensive list of countries that base their legal system on a codified civil law follows:

Common law

Common law and equity are systems of law whose sources are the decisions in cases by judges. In addition, every system will have a legislature that passes new laws and statutes. The relationships between statutes and judicial decisions can be complex. In some jurisdictions, such statutes may overrule judicial decisions or codify the topic covered by several contradictory or ambiguous decisions. In some jurisdictions, judicial decisions may decide whether the jurisdiction's constitution allowed a particular statute or statutory provision to be made or what meaning is contained within the statutory provisions. The common law developed in England, influenced by Anglo-Saxon law and to a much lesser extent by the Norman conquest of England, which introduced legal concepts from Norman law, which, in turn, had its origins in Salic law. Common law was later inherited by the Commonwealth of Nations, and almost every former colony of the British Empire has adopted it (Malta being an exception). The doctrine of stare decisis, also known as case law or precedent by courts, is the major difference to codified civil law systems.

Common law is practiced in Canada (excluding Quebec), Australia, New Zealand, most of the United Kingdom (England, Wales, and Northern Ireland), South Africa, Ireland, India (excluding Goa), Pakistan, Hong Kong, the United States (on state and territorial levels excluding Louisiana and Puerto Rico), Bangladesh, and many other places. Several others have adapted the common law system into a mixed system; For example, Nigeria operates largely on a common law system in the southern states and at the federal level, but also incorporates religious law in the northern states.

In the European Union, the Court of Justice takes an approach mixing civil law (based on the treaties) with an attachment to the importance of case law. One of the most fundamental documents to shape common law is the English Magna Carta, which placed limits on the power of the English Kings. It served as a kind of medieval bill of rights for the aristocracy and the judiciary who developed the law.

Religious law

Religious law refers to the notion of a religious system or document being used as a legal source, though the methodology used varies. For example, the use of Judaism and halakha for public law has a static and unalterable quality, precluding amendment through legislative acts of government or development through judicial precedent; Christian canon law is more similar to civil law in its use of codes; and Islamic sharia law (and fiqh jurisprudence) is based on legal precedent and reasoning by analogy (qiyas), and is thus considered similar to common law.

The main kinds of religious law are sharia in Islam, halakha in Judaism, and canon law in some Christian groups. In some cases these are intended purely as individual moral guidance, whereas in other cases they are intended and may be used as the basis for a country's legal system; the latter was particularly common during the Middle Ages.

Halakha is followed by Orthodox and Conservative Jews in both ecclesiastical and civil relations. No country is fully governed by halakha, but two Jewish people may decide, because of personal belief, to have a dispute heard by a Jewish court, and be bound by its rulings.

Canon law is the internal ecclesiastical law, or operational policy, governing the Catholic Church (both the Latin Church and the Eastern Catholic Churches), the Eastern Orthodox and Oriental Orthodox churches, and the individual national churches within the Anglican Communion. Canon law of the Catholic Church is the system of laws and legal principles made and enforced by the hierarchical authorities of the Catholic Church to regulate its external organisation and government and to order and direct the activities of Catholics toward the mission of the church. The canon law of the Catholic Church has all the ordinary elements of a mature legal system: laws, courts, lawyers, judges. The canon law of the Latin Church was the first modern Western legal system, and is the oldest continuously functioning legal system in the West. while the distinctive traditions of Eastern Catholic canon law govern the 23 Eastern Catholic particular churches sui iuris. 

The Islamic legal system, consisting of sharia (Islamic law) and fiqh (Islamic jurisprudence), is the most widely used religious law system, and one of the three most common legal systems in the world alongside common law and civil law. It is based on both divine law, derived from the hadith of the Quran and Sunnah, and the rulings of ulema (jurists), who use the methods of ijma (consensus), qiyas (analogical deduction), ijtihad (research), and urf (common practice) to derive fatwā (legal opinions). An ulema was required to qualify for an ijazah (legal doctorate) at a madrasa (law school or college) before they could issue fatwā. During the Islamic Golden Age, classical Islamic law may have had an influence on the development of common law and several civil law institutions. Sharia law governs a number of Islamic countries, including Saudi Arabia and Iran, though most countries use Sharia law only as a supplement to national law. It can relate to all aspects of civil law, including property rights, contracts, and public law.

Pluralistic systems

Civil law and canon law

Canon law is not divine law, properly speaking, because it is not found in revelation. Instead, it is seen as human law inspired by the word of God and applying the demands of that revelation to the actual situation of the church. Canon law regulates the internal ordering of the Catholic Church, the Eastern Orthodox Church and the Anglican Communion. Canon law is amended and adopted by the legislative authority of the church, such as councils of bishops, individual bishops for their respective sees, the Pope for the entire Catholic Church, and the British Parliament for the Church of England.

Civil law and common law

Civil law and sharia law

Common law and sharia law

By geography
Despite the usefulness of different classifications, every legal system has its own individual identity. Below are groups of legal systems, categorised by their geographic location.

See also

Anarchist law
Comparative law
English common law
International customary law
Sharia
Qanun (law)
Legal pluralism
Journal of Legal Pluralism
Rule of law
Rule According to Higher Law
Socialist law
Soviet law
Tribal sovereignty
Western law
Comparative law wiki
Legal education

References

Sources 

 Books
 Moustaira Elina N., Comparative Law: University Courses (in Greek), Ant. N. Sakkoulas Publishers, Athens, 2004, .
 Moustaira Elina N., Milestones in the Course of Comparative Law: Thesis and Antithesis (in Greek), Ant. N. Sakkoulas Publishers, Athens, 2003, .
 Palmer, Vernon Valentine, Mohamed Y. Mattar, & Anna Kopper, eds. Mixed Legal Systems, East and West. Farnham–Burlington, VT: Ashgate, 2014.

External links 
 World Legal Systems, Website of the Faculty of Law of the University of Ottawa
  Factbook list of legal systems

Comparative law
List